Oedisterna is a genus of beetles in the family Buprestidae, containing the following species:

 Oedisterna abyla (Gory, 1840)
 Oedisterna adspersipennis (Boheman, 1860)
 Oedisterna bisulcata (Laporte & Gory, 1836)
 Oedisterna boera Obenberger, 1924
 Oedisterna carinata Kerremans, 1911
 Oedisterna cicatricosa Kerremans, 1911
 Oedisterna cuprea (Linnaeus, 1758)
 Oedisterna guillarmodi Descarpentries, 1970
 Oedisterna holubi Obenberger, 1936
 Oedisterna liberta (Kerremans, 1898)
 Oedisterna livida Péringuey, 1892
 Oedisterna nickerli Obenberger, 1936
 Oedisterna nigritula Kerremans, 1911
 Oedisterna peringueyi Kerremans, 1911
 Oedisterna pretoriae Kerremans, 1911
 Oedisterna strandi Obenberger, 1936
 Oedisterna subcuprea Théry, 1943
 Oedisterna westermanni (Laporte & Gory, 1837)

References

Buprestidae genera